The 29th Indian Infantry Brigade was an infantry brigade formation of the Indian Army during World War II. It was formed on 11 October 1940, by the renumbering of the British 21st Infantry Brigade. It was assigned to the 5th Indian Infantry Division. They took part in the East African Campaign and the Western Desert Campaign and was destroyed on 28 June 1942 during the fighting at Fuka during the First Battle of El Alamein.

Composition
 1st Battalion, Worcestershire Regiment October 1940 to June 1942
 1st Battalion, Essex Regiment October 1940
 3rd Battalion, 2nd Punjab Regiment October 1940 to March 1941 and May 1941 to June 1942
 6th Battalion, 13th Frontier Force Rifles October 1940 to May 1942
 1st Battalion, 2nd Punjab Regiment January 1942
 1st Battalion, 5th Mahratta Light Infantry May to June 1942
 2nd Battalion, Highland Light Infantry June 1942
 2nd Field Company, Indian Engineers August to November 1941

See also

 List of Indian Army Brigades in World War II

References

Brigades of India in World War II